Les Moulins is a regional county municipality in the Lanaudière region of Quebec, Canada.

It is located immediately north of Laval on the north shore of the Rivière des Mille-Îles, and comprises the municipalities of Terrebonne and Mascouche. Historic communities in the region, which are now arrondissements of the two existing cities, include Lachenaie and La Plaine.

The population according to the 2016 Canadian Census was 158,267

Subdivisions
There are 2 subdivisions within the RCM:

Cities & Towns (2)
 Mascouche
 Terrebonne

Transportation

Access Routes
Highways and numbered routes that run through the municipality, including external routes that start or finish at the county border:

 Autoroutes
 
 
 

 Principal Highways
 

 Secondary Highways
 
 
 

 External Routes
 None

See also
 List of regional county municipalities and equivalent territories in Quebec

References

External links
 MRC Les Moulins

Regional county municipalities in Lanaudière
Census divisions of Quebec
Terrebonne, Quebec